Mitta Mitta is a farming community in the north eastern part of the Riverina.

Mitta Mitta is locatable only by finding the old St Stephen's Anglican Church situated  along a corrugated dirt road that runs west from the Nangus to Bethungra road.

The name Mitta Mitta is derived from the local Aboriginal words "mida-modunga" meaning "where reeds grow".

Mitta Mitta Post Office opened on 1 January 1888, was reduced to a Telephone Office in 1931 and closed in 1936.

References and notes

Towns in the Riverina
Towns in New South Wales